Edward Crutchley (2 April 1922 – 18 October 1982) was an English cricketer who played two first-class matches for Middlesex County Cricket Club in 1947.

Crutchley was born at Paddington in London, the son of Gerry Crutchley who had played for Middlesex between 1910 and 1930. He was educated at Harrow School where he was in the cricket XI, scoring a century against Eton College at Lord's in 1939.

He studied at Christ Church, Oxford and then served in the British Army during World War II. Crutchley  died in a nursing home at Guildford in 1982 aged 60.

References

External links

1922 births
1982 deaths
English cricketers
Middlesex cricketers
British Army personnel of World War II